Nasser bin Qassim Al Qasabi (born 28 November 1961 in Riyadh, Saudi Arabia) is a Saudi Arabian actor. He started his acting career in 1984 and is known for his various roles in the series Tash Ma Tash (Arabic: طاش ما طاش). In 2012, Nasser became one of the three judges on the television series Arabs Got Talent.

Al Qasbi has featured in a Saudi TV show satirising ISIL called Selfie in 2015 during Ramadan.

References

External links 
 
 Nasser Al Qasabi at ElCinema.com (Arabic)

Living people
Saudi Arabian male television actors
Saudi Arabian male comedians
King Saud University alumni
People from Riyadh
1961 births